My Buddy is a 1983 album by Rosemary Clooney, accompanied by Woody Herman and his orchestra.

Track listing 
 "I Believe in Love" (Alan and Marilyn Bergman, Kenny Loggins) – 4:56
 "The Summer Knows" (A. Bergman, M. Bergman, Michel Legrand) – 4:47
 "The Glory of Love" (Billy Hill) – 3:34
 "You're Gonna Hear from Me" (André Previn, Dory Previn) – 3:40
 "Don't Let Me Be Lonely Tonight" (James Taylor) – 5:09
 "I'm Beginning to See the Light" (Duke Ellington, Don George, Johnny Hodges) – 3:37
 "My Buddy" (Walter Donaldson, Gus Kahn) – 4:26
 "You've Made Me So Very Happy" (Berry Gordy, Patrice Holloway, Brenda Holloway, Frank Wilson) – 4:39

Personnel 
 Rosemary Clooney – vocals
 Woody Herman and his Orchestra

References 

1983 albums
Rosemary Clooney albums
Woody Herman albums
Albums produced by Carl Jefferson
Concord Records albums